Samuel Joel Telfer is an Australian politician. He has been a Liberal member of the South Australian House of Assembly since the 2022 state election, representing Electoral district of Flinders. Before entering parliament, he served as mayor of Tumby Bay District Council and president of the Eyre Peninsula Local Government Association.

References 

Living people
Members of the South Australian House of Assembly
21st-century Australian politicians
Liberal Party of Australia members of the Parliament of South Australia
Year of birth missing (living people)